Robinsonia cajali is a moth in the family Erebidae. It was described by Carlos Christian Hoffmann in 1934. It is found in Mexico.

References

Moths described in 1934
Robinsonia (moth)
Arctiinae of South America